Humble is a town in south Denmark, located in Langeland Municipality on the island of Langeland in Region of Southern Denmark. It has a population of 604 (1 January 2022). Humble is located about 12 kilometers north of Bagenkop and 14 kilometers south of Rudkøbing.

History
In the late 19th century, Humble had a doctor's house, a grocery store, and a sawmill. Humble Skytte og Forsamlingshus that no longer exists, was founded in 1884. A transcript of the house's first protocol is preserved.

Humble Station was a stop on the Rudkøbing-Bagenkop train line. The station was built in 1910 and closed in 1962.

Facilities
The town has a bakery. Humble Inn & Hotel has built seven new rooms in 2008 and can accommodate parties of up to 150 people.

Music Efterskolen in Humble has many rehearsal rooms, a recording studio, and a fully equipped orchestra pit to the concert and theater. Schools organize the annual Christmas concerts, gospel concerts, musicals, etc. there.

Humble School was inaugurated in 1960 as Humble Central School.

References

Cities and towns in the Region of Southern Denmark
Langeland Municipality